Guy Fleming Lipscomb, Jr. (April 11, 1917 — December 31, 2009) was a business owner, chemist, civic leader, philanthropist, artist, author, teacher, and star collegiate athlete. In his later years, he became a noted painter working in acrylics and watercolors and was both a member of the Southern Watercolor Society and a Signature Member of the American Watercolor Society.

Life 
Lipscomb was born in Clemson, South Carolina. He won numerous awards in his lifetime including the Order of the Palmetto presented by Governor Richard Riley and the 1982 Elizabeth O’Neil Verner Award presented by the South Carolina Arts Commission, and his works have been shown in the National Academy of Art, the American Watercolor Society in New York City, and in many regional and national competitions. He taught other artists throughout the United States and Canada. His book, Watercolor: Go With the Flow, has become a staple in watercolor instruction classes. Lipscomb was founding member of the South Carolina Watercolor Society and a "force behind the creation of the South Carolina State Museum", and he "significantly shaped the cultural scene in South Carolina."

Mr. Lipscomb is interred at Trinity Episcopal Cathedral, Columbia, SC.

References

1917 births
2009 deaths
20th-century American educators
20th-century American painters
American male painters
21st-century American painters
Modern painters
Artists from South Carolina
20th-century American male artists